The Sydney Writers Walk is a series of 60 circular metal plaques embedded in the footpath between Overseas Passenger Terminal on West Circular Quay and the Sydney Opera House forecourt on East Circular Quay.

The plaques were installed to honour and celebrate the lives and works of well-known Australian writers, as well as notable overseas authors, such as D. H. Lawrence, Joseph Conrad and Mark Twain, who lived in or visited Australia. Quotes from a significant work and some biographical information about the writer are stamped onto each plaque, along with an excerpt of the author's writing.

The walk was created by the NSW Ministry for the Arts in 1991, and the series was extended when a further 11 plaques were added in 2011. However, as one journalist pointed out, the plaques are not updated. For example, Thea Astley's plaque gives the year she was born (1925) but there is no reference to her death in 2004. The same is true for Oodgeroo Noonuccal, who died in 1993; Judith Wright (d. 2000); A. D. Hope (d.2000); Dorothy Hewett (d.2002), and Ruth Park (d.2010).

In 2014 the Rotary Club of Sydney Cove published a guide to the Walk.

List 
Writers marked with an asterisk * were the subject of plaques added to the Walk in 2011.

References

External links
 Monuments Australia – Sydney Writers Walk

Walks of fame
Cultural depictions of writers
Lists of tourist attractions in Sydney
Australian literature-related lists
Public art in Sydney